Niclas Grönholm (born 29 May 1996) is a Finnish racing driver currently participating in the FIA World Rallycross Championship racing for GRX-SET World RX Team. He is the son of two time World Rally Champion Marcus Grönholm.

Racing record

Complete FIA World Rallycross Championship results

Supercar/RX1/RX1e

a Fifteen championship points deducted for use of a fourth engine seal.
b Ten championship points deducted for use of a new turbo seal after initial scrutineering.
c Fifteen championship points deducted for use of more than three engine seals in the season.
d Ten championship points deducted for use of a seventh turbocharger in the season.

RX Lites Cup

RallyX on Ice
(key)

Complete WRC results

References

External links

  profile 

Living people
Finnish racing drivers
World Rallycross Championship drivers
1996 births
Swedish-speaking Finns
People from Kauniainen
Sportspeople from Uusimaa